Jozef Ján Matejka (born 10 March 1949 Trenčin, Czechoslovakia) is a Slovak doctor and writer.

He started taking an interest in poetry during his college studies, however he became serious about writing his own work during the year 2000, when he moved with his family to Malta, where he wrote and later published his first book, Príležitostné Básne, a collection of his poems. Matejka has authored six books. During the course of writing and publishing his books, Matejka worked with two Slovak painters and a photographer, who had helped him with the illustrations for his books.

Bibliography

References 

 Article by Jozef Javurek
 Pictures from the book signing at the Library of Michal Rešetka, Trenčin
 Online Version of published article in the Malta Independent Online
 Interview and discussion on the Slovak radio "Devín" 
 Two interview segments on the "Trenčianska Televízia" channel
 Article in the "Trenčin Times" 
 Article in the "Malta Independent"
 Article in "A Czech folktale retold – Times of Malta" newspaper 
 Article in "On the wings of poetry – Times of Malta" newspaper
 Article on "Illegal immigration - Zivot (Slovak Magazine)"
 Listed on the Annual report of the "National Book Council Malta" newspaper
 Article on "Ľudskosť je krásno, ktoré dekoruje náš život - http://nastrencin.sme.sk/ (Slovak Online Magazine)"
 Article by Jozef Javurek
 Article Lekár ktorý má rád poéziu
 Article Rádiológ Jozef s básnickým črevom prepísal Budulienka a Pinocchia do veršov: Poznajú ho aj v Afrike!

Living people
1949 births
People from Trenčín
Slovak male writers